MikuMikuDance (commonly abbreviated to MMD) is a freeware animation program that lets users animate and create 3D animated films, originally produced for the Vocaloid character Hatsune Miku. The MikuMikuDance program itself was programmed by Yu Higuchi (HiguchiM) and has gone through significant upgrades since its creation. Its production was made as part of the VOCALOID Promotion Video Project (VPVP).

Overview
The software allows users to import 3D models into a virtual space that can be moved and animated accordingly. The positioning of the 3D figures can be easily altered, the facial expressions can be altered (as long as the model has morphs to use), and motion data can be applied to the model to make it move. Along with these functions for models, accessories, stages, and backgrounds can be added to create an environment, and effects such as lens flares and AutoLuminous (an effect that makes things glow and light up) can be applied as long as the MikuMikuEffect (MME) plugin is installed into the interface. Sound and music can also be added to create music videos, short films, and fan-made stories. The motion data used to animate the characters and the pose data mainly used for making screenshots can be exported as .vmd (Vocaloid Motion Data) files and .vpd (Vocaloid Pose Data) files, respectively. The exported files can then be imported into other projects made with software that can use the file types. This allows users to share the data with other users. The software also uses the Bullet physics engine. Users can also use Microsoft's Kinect for motion capturing. Map shadowing, screenshot rendering in several picture file formats and full movie rendering in the .avi file format are also possible.

With the exception of a few models, stages, motion data and accessories that come with the software upon download, all content, including the 3D models, is distributed by the users, meaning all rules and restrictions (or lack thereof) vary greatly from case to case. Most models' rules may be found in its Readme file, which may be a .txt, pdf or a webpage file.  The creator, HiguchiM, has stated he can make no promises regarding how other users' fan models can or cannot be used, and is exempt from all responsibility relating to this subject. Models created by other users are often available for public download. As MikuMikuDance is exclusively a posing and animation software, modelers use 3D modeling software, such as Blender or Metasequoia, to create the model and UV map, while the majority of conversion to the MMD platform (such as facial morphs, bones and physical bodies) is done with a program made exclusively for MMD model conversion, PMD Editor or its successor PMX editor.

The software itself comes with a small number of models of well-known Vocaloids and an invisible grid, to which particle effects can be attached to in MME, a stage, some accessories, and two samples of what MMD can do, in the form of .pmm files; the file type that MMD projects are saved as. The software was originally only released in Japanese; however an English version was released at a later date. Videos using the software are regularly seen on sites such as Nico Nico Douga and YouTube and are popular among Vocaloid fans and users alike.  A magazine which hands out exclusive models with every issue was also produced owing to this popularity.  Some models for Vocaloid may also be used for Vocaloid music, going on to be used by studios working with the Vocaloid software.

Many people also buy Windows100% magazines which give models exclusive to the public. These come out once every month and due to popularity, model creators are giving out secret models, as well as the models people have paid for. Most of these tend to be Vocaloid or models that do not have a particular copyright holder.

On May 26, 2011, continual updating of the software came to an end and the last version was released. In a closing statement, the creator left the software in the hands of the fans to continue building upon. Despite this, the source code has not been released, and the developer has no intentions of doing so, making it impossible for people to continue building upon the original software. However, there are alternative programs that provide similar functionality, such as MikuMikuMoving (MMD's "replacement" that is updated frequently and has many of the features of MMD, as well as new file formats unique to the program, support for the Oculus Rift head-mounted display and a new UI, among other features), and the free software, Blender.

Between then and now, there have been several additions to MMD version 7.39, mainly the addition of the x64 version, which runs better than the normal version and is designed to use the power of 64-bit computers that 32-bit computers lack. This results in better performance, faster render times, and higher quality, to name a few.
However, on June 1, 2013, MikuMikuDance's creator began to release updates for the program very suddenly. After he began releasing updates again, there have been 20 new versions and the 64-bit versions of them. Before June 1, the latest version was 7.39, which was released on May 26, 2011. MMD ver. 7.39 received several program updates between its initial release and the time of ver. 7.39m's release. Most of these updates were only made to increase compatibility with newer, more advanced .pmx models. It is unknown why the creator began editing the software again. On December 10, 2019, version 9.32 was released which is the most current version.

In December 2014, Sekai Project announced that they had acquired permission to release MikuMikuDance on Steam. However, it has been unreleased.

The first anime television series to be fully produced with the software, Straight Title Robot Anime, premiered on February 5, 2013.

Copyright
The software was released as freeware. The models of the Vocaloid mascot series provided with the software are subject to the Piapro Character License, and are not allowed to be used without permission for commercial reasons. Although the software is distributed freely, models released independently of the software may not be — original produced models, motion data, and landscapes may be subject to their creator's own rules. The program does not include all of the Vocaloid characters by default, but it includes Crypton Future Media's Vocaloids which are Hatsune Miku, Kagamine Rin, Kagamine Len, KAITO, MEIKO, and Megurine Luka; and although Yowane Haku, Akita Neru, Sakine Meiko, and Kasane Teto are not official Vocaloids (Teto being an UTAU), they became so popular that Crypton officially licensed and added them to Project Diva.

References

External links

3D animation software
Creative works using vocaloids
Windows graphics-related software
Freeware game engines